An outfielder is a person playing in one of the three defensive positions in baseball or softball, farthest from the batter. These defenders are the left fielder, the center fielder, and the right fielder. As an outfielder, their duty is to catch fly balls and ground balls then to return them to the infield for the out or before the runner advances, if there are any runners on the bases. As an outfielder, they normally play behind the six players located in the field.
By convention, each of the nine defensive positions in baseball is numbered. The outfield positions are 7 (left field), 8 (center field) and 9 (right field). These numbers are shorthand designations useful in baseball scorekeeping and are not necessarily the same as the squad numbers worn on player uniforms.

Outfielders named to the MLB All-Century Team are Hank Aaron, Ty Cobb, Joe DiMaggio, Mickey Mantle, Willie Mays, Stan Musial, Pete Rose, Babe Ruth, Ted Williams, Carl Yastrzemski, and Ken Griffey Jr.

Strategy

Players can be characterized as either corner outfielders or a center fielder. Corner outfielders are often slower and have less defensive value than the center fielder. However, there are some important differences between right fielders and left fielders. Right fielders tend to have the best throwing arms of the outfield so they can make the long throw to third base, but often are not as fast as left fielders. Center fielders are generally the fastest and most athletic of the three, because they have to run the farthest in order to field balls in the gaps and back up the other outfielders when balls are hit to them. Outfielders should also be able to read where the ball may be placed based on what the pitcher is throwing. They can tell what the pitcher is throwing by the middle infielders, second base and short stop, in which they show the numbers the catcher is giving to the pitcher behind their back to determine the pitch and tell where the ball could possibly be hit to.

Many of the best power hitters in baseball play in the outfield, where they do not have as constant involvement in fielding plays as other positions, especially before the institution of the designated hitter. For example, Babe Ruth was moved from pitcher to the outfield. Left fielders and right fielders are more often slow power hitters, and center fielders are usually fast base-runners and good defensive players. Center field is often considered the most difficult outfield position, requiring both a good throwing arm and speed. Center fielders on many teams often bat lead off.

Players who do not routinely start games, but often substitute as a pinch hitter or defensive replacement in the outfield are referred to as fourth outfielders or even fifth outfielders. These players can usually play any of the three outfield positions.

Corner outfielders
Corner outfielders are outfielders who play the corner positions of right field and left field.  Corner outfielders often have less speed than center fielders, but make up for this deficiency with their offensive play. The main differences between left and right fielders are, first, that left fielders handle more chances because right-handed pull hitters tend to hit balls to left; second, that right fielders typically have stronger arms; third, that right fielders are frequently (not always) slower and less agile defensively. Many left fielders have had the speed to play center field, but have lacked the throwing ability required.

An example of an ultra-fast left fielder is Rickey Henderson (Ben Oglivie and Lou Brock can fit this description too), whereas the slow-footed but very strong-armed Carl Furillo, "The Reading Rifle," sets a standard for right fielders in the terms specified here.

Gorman Thomas is an example of the reverse theory. He was a centerfielder his entire career (mainly with the Milwaukee Brewers), but was not nearly in shape as the typical player for this position. He compensated for it with sheer hustle and determination.

Often, when an outfield prospect arrives in the majors, he plays both corner positions before settling at one or another.

References

Baseball positions